Pyatnitsa! (literally Friday!) is an all-Russian entertainment TV channel. Its broadcast network is based on original entertainment programs of its own production, as well as those produced by Ukrainian TV channels. Friday! began broadcasting on 31 May 2013 on MTV Russia.

Programming

Shows
In-house productions
 Oryol i Reshka (Heads or Tails)
 Oryol i Reshka. Shopping (Heads or Tails. Shopping)
 Revizorro (Auditor)
 Magazzino (Shopping Auditor)
 Veryu — Ne veryu (Believe — Don't Believe)
 #ZhannaPozheni (#ZhannaMarryUs)
 Bitva salonov (Battle of Beauty Salons)
 Bitva restoranov (Battle of Restaurants)
 Eda, ya lyublyu tebya! (Food, I love you!)
 Bogach — Bednyak (Rich Man — Poor Man)
 Blokbastery (Blockbusters)
 Sdelka (Deal)
 Kanikuly v Meksike (Vacations in Mexico)
 Pyatnitsa! News (Friday! News)
 Robin Fud (Robin Food)
 Na nozhah (Kitchen Nightmares)
 Opasnye gastroli (Dangerous Tour)
 Bitva Rieltorov (Battle of Realtors)
 Baryshnya - Krestyanka (Mistress Into Maid)
 Patsanki (She's like a boy)
 Konditer (Confectioner)
 Takiye roditeli (Such parents)
 Oryol i Reshka. Na svyazi (Heads or Tails. In touch)
 Boy s Gerls (Fight with the Girls)]
 Oryol i Reshka. Sidim Doma (Heads or Tails. Sitting at home)
 Oryol i Reshka. Bezumnyye vykhodnyye (Heads or Tails. Crazy weekend)
 Oblozhka (Cover) ]
 Doktor Bessmertnyy (Dr. Immortal)
 Lyubov' na vyzhivaniye (Love for survival)
 Mir naiznanku (World inside out)
 Oryol i Reshka. Ivleyeva VS Bednyakov (Heads or Tails. Ivleeva VS Bednyakov)
 Utro Pyatnitsy (Friday morning)
 Dikari (Savages)
 Dve devitsy za granitsey (Two girls abroad)
 Mylodrama (Mylodrama)
 Turisticheskaya politsiya (Tourist police)
 Sekretnyy millioner (Secret Millionaire)
 Oryol i Reshka. Rossiya (Heads or Tails. Russia)
 Adskaya kukhnya (Hell's Kitchen)
 Chernyy spisok (Black list)
 Oryol i Reshka. Sem'ya (Heads or Tails. Family)
 Oryol i Reshka. Chudesa sveta (Heads or Tails. Wonders of the World)
 Chetyre svad'by (Four weddings)
 Dve devitsy na meli (Two girls are aground)
 Regina +1 (Regina +1)
 Insaydery (Insiders)
 Teper' ya Boss (Now i'm the boss)
 Meykapery (Makeupers)
 YA tvoye schast'ye (I am your happiness)
 Russo Latino. Peru (Russo Latino. Peru)
 Poprosi u neba (Ask from the sky)
 Podium (Podium)
 Khuligany (Hooligans)
 Kletka (Cell)
 Rabochiy eksperiment (Working experiment)
 Zov Krovi (Call of blood)
 Patsanki za granitsey (Boys Abroad)
 Tatu navsegda (Forever tattoo)
 Instagramshchitsy (Instagram women)
 Patimeykery (Party makers)
 Pyatnitsa s Reginoy (Friday with Regina)
 Zhizn': zabesplatno (Life: free)
 Selfi-Detektiv (Selfie Detective)
 Revizorro-Meditsinno (Auditor Medical)
 Khelou, Rasha (Hello, Russia)
 Na nozhah (Kitchen Nightmares. Hotels)
 Bliznetsy (Twins)
 Revizolushka (Auditor. Kids)
 General'naya uborka (Spring-cleaning)
 Golos ulits (The voice of the streets)
 Nasledniki (The heirs)
 Mozhem povtorit (Can repeat)
 Lyubimtsy (Favorites)
 Bednyakov +1 (Bednyakov +1)
 Istorii Pobedy (Victory Stories)
 #ZhannaPomogi (#ZhannaHelp)
 Lesya Zdesya (Lesya Here)
 Shkola doktora Komarovskogo (School of Dr. Komarovsky)
 Revizorro-Shou (Auditor-Show)
 Bol'shiye chuvstva (Big feelings)
 Zhivyye (Living)
 Yest' odin sekret (There's one secret)
 Shkaf (Cupboard)
 Yut'yubinsk (YouTube City)
Series
 Teen Wolf
 Pretty Little Liars
 Client List
 Supernatural

Awards
The card game Favorite game TV channel Friday!, launched together with the game company Mosigra, won the Mediabrand award as the Best off-air promotional campaign.

References

External links
 Official website

Television channels and stations established in 2013
Russian-language television stations in Russia